The 2006–07 Belmont Bruins men's basketball team represented Belmont University in the 2006–07 NCAA Division I men's basketball season. The Bruins, led by head coach Rick Byrd, played their home games at the Curb Event Center in Nashville, Tennessee, as members of the Atlantic Sun Conference. After finishing 2nd in the conference regular season standings, the Bruins won the Atlantic Sun tournament to earn an automatic bid to the NCAA tournament as the 15th seed in the East region. Belmont was beaten by 2nd seed Georgetown in the first round, 80–55.

Roster 

Source

Schedule and results

|-
!colspan=12 style=|Regular season

|-
!colspan=12 style=| Atlantic Sun tournament

|-
!colspan=12 style=| NCAA tournament

Source

References

Belmont Bruins men's basketball seasons
Belmont
Belmont
Belmont Bruins men's basketball
Belmont Bruins men's basketball